The Pictish Beast (sometimes Pictish Dragon or Pictish Elephant) is an artistic representation of an animal depicted on Pictish symbol stones.

Design
The Pictish Beast is not easily identifiable with any real animal, but resembles a seahorse, especially when depicted upright. Suggestions have included a dolphin, a kelpie (or each uisge), and even the Loch Ness Monster.

Recent thinking is that the Pictish Beast might be related to the design of dragonesque brooches, which were S-shaped pieces of jewelry, made from the mid-1st to the  2nd century CE, that depict double-headed animals with swirled snouts and distinctive ears. These have been found in southern Scotland and northern England. The strongest evidence for this is the presence on the Mortlach 2 stone of a symbol very similar to such a brooch, next to and in the same alignment as a Pictish Beast.

The Pictish Beast accounts for about 40% of all Pictish animal depictions, and so was likely of great importance.

The Pictish Beast is thought to have been an important figure in Pictish mythology, and possibly even a political symbol.

See also
Celtic art
Loch Ness Monster
Picts
Kelpie

References

Bibliography

External links
Pictish Art And The Sea, Craig Cessford, The Heroic Age

Scottish legendary creatures
Symbols on Pictish stones
Scottish mythology